Harald Sunde may refer to:

Harald Sunde (footballer) (born 1944), Norwegian international footballer
Harald Sunde (general) (born 1954), Norwegian military officer, Chief of Defence of Norway